A list of films produced in France in 1999.

External links
 1999 in France
 1999 in French television
 French films of 1999 at the Internet Movie Database
French films of 1999 at Cinema-francais.fr

1999
Films
French